Lees is an OC Transpo light rail transit station in Ottawa, Ontario, Canada. It had previously been a transitway station, which closed in January 2016 and was converted into an O-Train station.

Location

It is located south of the Highway 417 just to the west of the Rideau River. It serves the Lees Avenue and Sandy Hill Heights communities, as well as the Lees Campus of the University of Ottawa.

History

The transitway station has had quite a notorious history for serious incidents. Soon after the station was constructed, coal tar began seeping into the station and it was closed for two months. It was soon discovered that this industrial waste was under much of the Lees Avenue area, necessitating a $6 million cleanup operation.

The station was also the site of a deadly accident on July 18, 1994, when a 30-tonne transport truck plunged off the exit ramp of Highway 417 onto the transitway, killing two women and leaving a nine-month-old with permanent brain damage. The driver was later found guilty of dangerous driving. 

In July 2003, an eastbound bus approaching the station lost control due to a mechanical breakdown, and slammed into the station. No one was seriously injured, but it took months to repair the station.

In December 2015, the Transitway from Lees station to Blair station was closed; it reopened on September 14, 2019, when Confederation Line service began.

Layout

Lees is a side platform station located at grade in a cutting. Above the platforms, the station's entrance building contains the ticket barrier and gives access to a plaza on the north side of Lees Avenue. 

The station's artwork, Transparent Passage by Amy Thompson, features a series of forest designs on the station's glass platform walls, backed by sculptures of birds in flight along the retaining walls behind them.

Service

The following routes serve Lees as of October 6, 2019:

Notes:
 Routes  and  heading towards Rideau station do not serve this station.

References

External links
Lees station page
Lees area map

Confederation Line stations
1983 establishments in Ontario
Railway stations in Canada opened in 2019
2019 establishments in Ontario
2015 disestablishments in Ontario